Vladimir Dišljenković (Serbian Cyrillic: Bлaдимиp Дишљeнкoвић, Ukrainian: Вoлoдимир Дишленкович Volodymyr Dyshlenkovych; born July 2, 1981 in Belgrade) is a Ukrainian-Serbian footballer.

Personal life
Having played in Ukraine for six years, Dišljenković will no longer be considered a foreign player while playing in Ukraine since he obtained Ukrainian citizenship on March 2, 2010, although he had to revoke his Serbian passport.

References

External links
Profile at Serbian federation

Profile and early career at Dekisa.Tripod
 

Living people
1981 births
Footballers from Belgrade
Serbian footballers
Serbia and Montenegro international footballers
Serbia and Montenegro under-21 international footballers
Serbia international footballers
Serbian expatriate footballers
FK Napredak Kruševac players
Red Star Belgrade footballers
FC Metalurh Donetsk players
Ukrainian Premier League players
Expatriate footballers in Ukraine
Association football goalkeepers
Serbian emigrants to Ukraine
Naturalized citizens of Ukraine
Serbia and Montenegro expatriate footballers
Serbia and Montenegro footballers
Serbia and Montenegro expatriate sportspeople in Ukraine
Serbian expatriate sportspeople in Ukraine
FC Metalist Kharkiv players